"I'm Gonna Hire a Wino to Decorate Our Home" is a song written by Dewayne Blackwell, and recorded by American country music artist David Frizzell.  It was released in  April 1982 as the first single from the album The Family's Fine, But This One's All Mine.  The song was Frizzell's only number one on the country chart as a solo artist.  The single went to number one for one week and spent a total of 14 weeks in country music's top 40.

Along with reaching No. 3 on the magazine's Top Country Tracks chart, the song unexpectedly became a mainstream pop hit in Canada, peaking at No. 20 on the RPM Top Singles chart.

Content
The song talks of a wife who grows tired of her husband's barhopping (and spending his entire paycheck doing so).  She then comes up with a unique plan – she decides to redecorate their house into a bar, and play the part of bartender/waitress as an inducement to get her husband to stay at home (and possibly bring his friends along with him, so they can spend their paychecks).  While he recovers from his hangover the following morning, she will deposit the proceeds in their bank account.

Charts

Weekly charts

Year-end charts

References

1982 singles
David Frizzell songs
Songs written by Dewayne Blackwell
Song recordings produced by Snuff Garrett
Warner Records singles
1982 songs